Taichi Vakasama (born 12 October 1999) is a Fijian swimmer. He competed in the men's 100 metre breaststroke event at the 2018 FINA World Swimming Championships (25 m), in Hangzhou, China. He also represented Fiji in the men's 200m breaststroke heats at the 2020 Olympics. 

At the 2020 Summer Olympics, he was the flag bearer for Team Fiji

References

External links
 

1999 births
Living people
Fijian male swimmers
Male breaststroke swimmers
Olympic swimmers of Fiji
Swimmers at the 2020 Summer Olympics
Swimmers at the 2022 Commonwealth Games
Commonwealth Games competitors for Fiji
Place of birth missing (living people)